Elliot Quest is a side-scrolling action-adventure platform game by Mexican developer Ansimuz Games. It was released for Microsoft Windows in 2014, followed shortly by a Wii U port in 2015, and later to other platforms throughout 2017. It is similar to such games as Metroid, Castlevania II: Simon's Quest, and Zelda II: The Adventure of Link.

Plot
The demon Satar has placed a curse on Elliot, which will turn him into a demon as well if it is not lifted; Elliot sets out to search for a cure.

Gameplay
Elliot Quest is a side-scrolling action-adventure game, with a top-down overworld connecting the various areas.  At the beginning of the game, Elliot can do little but run, jump, and shoot arrows, but as he acquires new items and gains experience, he will gain new abilities, i.e., double jumping, bouncing off enemies, etc. These powers will let him access new places in the world. There are also towns in which Elliot can talk to NPCs for hints, which are usually cryptic.

Development
The game was originally developed in HTML5, which made the game playable on the PC and Wii U platforms, with the latter supported via the Nintendo Web Framework. The source code was ultimately ported to a C++ base, making it playable on other platforms.

Reception

Elliot Quest received generally positive reviews from critics. Nintendojo gave it an A+, its highest possible score, and concluded that "Elliot Quest offers one of the most entertaining and rewarding experiences an adventure game can offer." Nintendo World Report scored it 8/10 and called it a "tremendous game that, if you have any affinity for aspects of Zelda II and Metroid games, is something you should be getting as soon as possible." Arcade Sushi awarded the game 8/10, saying, "There’s no doubt that Elliot Quest is an homage to games like Zelda 2 and Castlevania, but there’s also a lot of originality here, especially in the game’s narrative." Digitally Downloaded.net was less enthusiastic, saying, giving the game 3/5 stars and saying, "It does just enough to build on the game it lifts its template from (Zelda 2: The Adventure of Link), but at the same time it fails to push the modern retro genre into modernity as games like Shovel Knight and Rogue Legacy have."

References

External links
Elliot Quest at GameFAQs
Elliot Quest at Giant Bomb

2014 video games
Action-adventure games
Linux games
Metroidvania games
MacOS games
Nintendo 3DS games
Nintendo 3DS eShop games
Nintendo Switch games
Ouya games
Platform games
PlayStation 4 games
Indie video games
PlayStation Network games
Retro-style video games
Video games about demons
Video games developed in Mexico
Wii U games
Wii U eShop games
Windows games
Xbox One games